David M. Cannon is an American attorney, businessman, and politician serving as a member of the Idaho House of Representatives from the 31st district. He assumed office on December 1, 2020.

Early life and education 
Cannon was born in Cleveland, Ohio and raised in Blackfoot, Idaho. After graduating from Blackfoot High School, Cannon earned a Bachelor of Arts degree in economics from Brigham Young University and a Juris Doctor from the S.J. Quinney College of Law at the University of Utah.

Career 
After graduating from law school, Cannon has worked as an attorney and operated a reclaimed wood business. Cannon was elected to the Idaho House of Representatives in November 2020 and assumed office on December 1, 2020.

Personal life 
Cannon and his wife, Lisa, have four children and two grandchildren.

References 

Living people
People from Cleveland
Idaho Republicans
People from Blackfoot, Idaho
Brigham Young University alumni
S.J. Quinney College of Law alumni
University of Utah alumni
Idaho lawyers
Year of birth missing (living people)